Peter Turner (18 December 1876 – 8 February 1970) was a Scottish footballer. He played as an inside forward.

Career
Born in Glasgow, Turner started his career in Scottish junior football, playing for Parkhead, St Bernard's, and the Scottish junior football team. He moved to England in 1900, playing for Woolwich Arsenal, Middlesbrough, Luton Town, Watford, Leyton and Doncaster Rovers.

References

1876 births
1970 deaths
Footballers from Glasgow
Scottish footballers
St Bernard's F.C. players
Arsenal F.C. players
Middlesbrough F.C. players
Luton Town F.C. players
Watford F.C. players
Leyton F.C. players
Doncaster Rovers F.C. players
English Football League players
Southern Football League players
Scottish Junior Football Association players
Parkhead F.C. players
Association football inside forwards
Midland Football League players